Charles Harold Croker-King (30 April 1873 – 25 October 1951) was a British stage and film actor who had a career from 1920 to 1937.

Biography
Charles Croker-King was born 30 April 1873 in Rock Helm, Yorkshire, England, and died 25 October 1951 in Dorset, England.

Filmography

References

External links

 
 portraits(NY Public Library, Billy Rose collection)
  Carol Dempster and C. Croker-King in "One Exciting Night"

1873 births
1951 deaths
English male film actors
English male silent film actors
English male stage actors
Male actors from Yorkshire
20th-century English male actors